Dewoin District is one of four administrative districts of Bomi County, Liberia.
As of 2008 the population was 12,782.

References

Districts of Liberia
Bomi County